The following is a list of notable deaths in April 2008.

Entries for each day are listed alphabetically by surname. A typical entry lists information in the following sequence:
 Name, age, country of citizenship at birth, subsequent country of citizenship (if applicable), reason for notability, cause of death (if known), and reference.

April 2008

1
Mosko Alkalai, 77, Israeli actor(Blaumilch Canal, The Fox in the Chicken Coop, Yana's Friends), respiratory failure.
Triston Jay Amero, 26, American hotel bomber, pulmonary edema.
Shosh Atari, 58, Israeli radio presenter and actress, heart attack.
Péter Baczakó, 56, Hungarian weightlifter, 1980 Olympic champion, cancer.
Sabin Bălaşa, 75, Romanian painter, heart attack.
Sherry Britton, 89, American burlesque dancer turned actor (Guys and Dolls).
Audrey Cahn, 102, Australian nutritionist and microbiologist.
Jim Finney, 83, British football referee.
Gabriel Mkhumane, Swazi opposition leader, shot.
Licínio Pereira da Silva, 63, Portuguese last political prisoner of PIDE during Estado Novo, nosocomial infection.
Floyd Simmons, 84, American decathlon Olympic bronze medallist (1948, 1952) and actor (South Pacific).
Otto Soemarwoto, 82, Indonesian professor and ecologist, Order of the Golden Ark recipient.
Marvin Stone, 26, American basketball player for Saudi Arabian Al-Ittihad (Jeddah) team, heart attack.

2
Norberto Collado Abreu, 87, Cuban naval officer, helmsman of the yacht Granma which carried Fidel Castro to Cuba in 1956.
Paul Arden, 67, British creative director and author.
Johnny Byrne, 72, Irish writer and script editor (Doctor Who, Heartbeat).
Sir Geoffrey Cox, 97, British founder of ITN News at Ten.
David Henshaw, 76, Australian politician, member of the Victorian Legislative Council for Geelong (1982–1996).
Ray Poole, 86, American football player (New York Giants), cancer.
Yakup Satar, 110, Crimean-born supercentenarian, believed to be the last Turkish veteran of World War I.
Mona Seilitz, 65, Swedish actress and entertainer, breast cancer.
Livio Spanghero, 88, Italian Olympic sailor Olympedia – Livio Spanghero
Adam Studziński, 97, Polish Roman Catholic Dominican priest, World War II chaplain of Polish forces.
Taotao, 36, Chinese oldest captive giant panda, brain thrombus and cerebral hemorrhage.

3
Percival Allen, 91, British geologist.
Andrew Crozier, 64, British poet, brain tumour.
Hrvoje Ćustić, 24, Croatian footballer (NK Zadar), head injury.
William Denman Eberle, 84, American businessman, U.S. Trade Representative (1971–1974), kidney failure.
Frosty Freeze, 44, American B-boy, breakdancer and member of the Rock Steady Crew.
Jeremy R. Knowles, 72, British-born Harvard University dean of Arts and Sciences (1991–2002), prostate cancer.
Ivan Korade, 44, Croatian general and murder suspect, apparent suicide by gunshot.
Leslie MacPhail, 55, Belgian Olympic judoka.
Vladimír Preclík, 78, Czech sculptor and writer.
Robert Tomasulo, 73, American computer scientist.

4
Harley Dickinson, 69, Australian politician, member of the Victorian Legislative Assembly (1982–1992).
Fay McKay, 78, American entertainer ("The Twelve Daze of Christmas").
Jerry Rosholt, 85, American journalist and historian.
Michael White, 59, Australian inventor of narrative therapy, cardiac arrest.
*Wu Xueqian, 87, Chinese politician, foreign minister (1982–1988).

5
Giuseppe Attardi, 84, American molecular biologist.
Iris Burton, 77, American talent agent, pneumonia and complications of Alzheimer's disease.
Eugene Ehrlich, 85, American lexicographer and author.
Alex Grasshoff, 79, American documentary filmmaker known for having his Academy Award revoked.
Charlton Heston, 84, American actor (Ben-Hur, Ten Commandments, Planet of the Apes), President of the National Rifle Association of America (1998–2003), Oscar winner (1960), pneumonia.
Walt Masterson, 87, American baseball player, stroke.
McKelvey, 9, British race horse, euthanised after fall during Grand National.
Frank Opsal, 79, Canadian Olympic shooter.
Steve Sinnott, 56, British general secretary of the National Union of Teachers since 2004, heart attack.
Wang Donglei, 23, Chinese footballer, car accident.
Sibte Hasan Zaidi, 89, Indian pathologist and toxicologist.

6
James Barrier, 55, American wrestler.
Lakshman de Alwis, 68, Sri Lankan national athletics coach, suicide bomb attack.
Tony Davies, 68, New Zealand rugby union player (All Blacks).
Jeyaraj Fernandopulle, 55, Sri Lankan highways minister, suicide bomb attack.
Abdou Latif Guèye, 52, Senegalese politician, sixth vice-president of the National Assembly (2007–2008), car accident.
Kuruppu Karunaratne, 47, Sri Lankan Olympic marathon runner, suicide bomb attack.
Naziur Rahman Manzur, 59, Bangladeshi politician, mayor of Dhaka City Corporation.
Abraham Osheroff, 92, American social activist, veteran of the Spanish Civil War (Abraham Lincoln Brigade), heart attack.
Gib Shanley, 76, American radio sportscaster (Cleveland Browns), pneumonia.
Jeu Sprengers, 69, Dutch chairman of the Royal Dutch Football Association.
*Teoh Chye Hin, 94, Malaysian secretary-general of the Asian Football Confederation (1974–1978).
Sir Francis Vallat, 95, British international lawyer.

7
Ludu Daw Amar, 92, Burmese journalist, writer and activist.
Kunio Egashira, 70, Japanese chairman of Ajinomoto, pancreatic cancer.
Ruth Greenglass, 84, American atomic spy for the Soviet Union, wife of David Greenglass, sister-in-law of Julius and Ethel Rosenberg.
Bob Howard, 63, American football player (San Diego Chargers), cancer.
Sir Frank Little, 82, Australian Roman Catholic prelate, Archbishop of Melbourne (1974–1996).
Mark Speight, 42, British TV presenter (SMart), suicide by hanging.
Gloria Taylor, 57, British activist and mother of murdered schoolboy Damilola Taylor, heart attack.
Andrei Tolubeyev, 63, Russian actor, pancreatic cancer.
Esko Tommola, 77, Finnish news anchor, after long illness.
Phil Urso, 82, American jazz tenor saxophonist and composer.

8
Timothy Beaumont, Baron Beaumont of Whitley, 79, British Green Party member of the House of Lords.
Cedella Booker, 81, Jamaican mother of Bob Marley, natural causes.
John Button, 74, Australian senator, minister for Industry, Technology and Commerce (1983–1993), pancreatic cancer.
Loren Driscoll, 79, American tenor.
Graham Higman, 91, British mathematician.
Seaman Jacobs, 96, American television writer (The Red Skelton Show, F Troop, The Jeffersons), cardiac arrest.
Stanley Kamel, 65, American actor (Monk, Domino, Cagney & Lacey), heart attack.
Hersh Lyons, 92, American baseball player (St. Louis Cardinals).
Kunio Ogawa, 80, Japanese novelist.
Nadezhda Rumyantseva, 77, Russian actress, brain tumor.
Jacqueline Voltaire, 59, British-born Mexican soap opera actress for Televisa, malignant melanoma.
Kees Wijdekop, 94, Dutch Olympic canoer.
Herbert Zearfoss, 78, American politician, member of the Pennsylvania House of Representatives.

9
Ángel Aguiar, 81, Cuban gymnast.
Abu Ubaidah al-Masri, Pakistani al-Qaeda senior operative, death from probable hepatitis confirmed on this date.
George Butler, 76, American record producer and A&R man (Blue Note, Columbia), complications from Alzheimer's disease.
Herman Carr, 83, American physicist, pioneer of MRI, heart disease.
Diego Catalán, 80, Spanish philologist, grandson of Ramón Menéndez Pidal, heart disease. 
Paul Dumont, 87, Canadian ice hockey administrator, kidney failure.
Burt Glinn, 82, American photographer, kidney failure and pneumonia.
Michael Golomb, 98, American mathematician.
Erkki Junkkarinen, 78, Finnish singer.
Bob Kames, 82, American polka musician, songwriter and popularizer of the Chicken Dance, prostate cancer.
Daniela Klemenschits, 25, Austrian tennis player, abdominal cancer.
Jacques Morel, 85, French actor, voice of Obelix.
Choubeila Rached, 75, Tunisian singer.
Marvin Sylvor, 75, American carousel designer, kidney failure.

10
Francis Coleman, 84, Canadian-born British conductor, television producer and director.
Ernesto Corripio y Ahumada, 88, Mexican cardinal, archbishop emeritus of Mexico.
Peter Dubovský, 86, Slovak Roman Catholic prelate, Auxiliary Bishop of Banská Bystrica (1991–1997).
Robert W. Greene, 78, American investigative journalist, heart failure.
Dickson Mabon, 82, British Labour and Social Democratic Party MP (1955–1983).
Jeremiah J. M. Nyagah, 87, Kenyan politician, pneumonia.
Marcel Pertry, 86, Belgian footballer (Cercle Brugge).
Gopal Raju, 80, American website pioneer of Indian ethnic media in USA (India Abroad, Indo-Asian News Service), jaundice.
Kim Santow, 67, Australian judge (NSW Supreme Court), chancellor of the University of Sydney (2001–2007), brain tumour.
Juan Ramón Sánchez, 51, Spanish actor, singer and artist (Barrio Sésamo), lung cancer.

11
Claude Abbes, 80, French football player.
J. Leon Altemose, 68, American developer and contractor.
Fraser Colman, 83, New Zealand politician, MP for Pencarrow (1978–1987).
Clyde Cook, 72, American president of Biola University (1982–2007).
Joan Hunter Dunn, 92, British muse of poet John Betjeman.
Willoughby Goddard, 81, British actor (Young Sherlock Holmes).
Harry Goonatilake, 78, Sri Lankan Air Force Commander (1976–1981).
Donald Macfadyen, Lord Macfadyen, 62, Scottish jurist.
Bob Pellegrini, 73, American football linebacker (Philadelphia Eagles).
Patricia Ziegfeld Stephenson, 91, American author, daughter of Florenz Ziegfeld and Billie Burke, heart failure.

12
Duilio Agostini, 82, Italian racer.
Cecilia Colledge, 87, British figure skater and 1936 Olympic silver medallist.
Valda Cooper, 92, Australian-born American journalist for the Associated Press.
Dieter Eppler, 81, German film actor and radio drama director.
Donald Forbes, 73, British convicted murderer.
Patrick Hillery, 84, Irish president (1976–1990) and minister (1959–1973), European commissioner for Ortoli Commission.
Abbas Katouzian, 86, Iranian painter.
Artur Maurício, 63, Portuguese Constitutional Court president (2004–2007), after long illness. 
Barbara McDermott, 95, American survivor of the  sinking.
Buzz Nutter, 77, American football player (Colts, Steelers), heart failure.
Augusta Wallace, 78, New Zealand district judge (1975–1990), after long illness.
Dwaine Wilson, 47, American former Canadian Football League player, drowned.
Jerry Zucker, 58, Israeli-born American businessman, cancer.

13
Elías Amézaga, 86, Spanish writer.
Nathaniel Bar-Jonah, 51, American kidnapper, heart attack.
Larry Elliott, 72, American college football coach (Washburn University).
Robert Greacen, 87, Irish poet.
Michael Mills, 80, Irish first government ombudsman (1984–1994).
Kedamangalam Sadanandan, 82, Indian actor.
John Archibald Wheeler, 96, American physicist who coined the term "black hole", pneumonia.
Khasan Yandiyev, 52, Russian deputy head of Ingushetia Supreme Court, shot.
Ross Yockey, 64, American Emmy Award-winning author, idiopathic pulmonary fibrosis.

14
Olivia Cenizal, 81, Filipino actress, colon disease.
Miguel Galván, 50, Mexican actor and comedian, respiratory arrest.
Werner "Frick" Groebli, 92, Swiss ice skating comedian (Frick and Frack).
Tommy Holmes, 91, American baseball player (Boston Braves).
Ollie Johnston, 95, American animator (Cinderella, Pinocchio, Mary Poppins), the last of Walt Disney's "Nine Old Men".
Marisa Sannia, 61, Italian singer.
Robert Somervaille, 86, Australian lawyer, chairman of the Australian Telecommunications Commission (1987–1991).
June Travis, 93, American actress.

15
Imre Antal, 72, Hungarian pianist, TV personality, actor and humorist, cancer.
David K. Brown, 79/80, British naval architect.
David Cass, 71, American economist.
Sean Costello, 28, American blues guitarist and singer, accidental drug overdose.
Hazel Court, 82, British actress (The Masque of the Red Death, The Raven), heart attack.
Cliff Davies, 59, American musician, drummer for Ted Nugent, apparent suicide by gunshot.
Brian Davison, 65, British musician, drummer for progressive rock band The Nice.
Parvin Dowlatabadi, 84, Iranian children's author and poet, heart attack.
Renata Fronzi, 82, Argentine-born Brazilian actress, multiple organ dysfunction syndrome. 
Hendrik S. Houthakker, 83, American economist.
Fernand Jaccard, 100, Swiss football midfielder.
Benoît Lamy, 62, Belgian motion picture writer-director, murdered.
Madeline Lee, 84, American actress and theatrical producer, wife of Jack Gilford.
Krister Stendahl, 86, Swedish Lutheran theologian and bishop.
Mahinārangi Tocker, 52, New Zealand musician, asthma attack.

16
Lou Allen, 83, American football player.
Joseph Cameron Alston, 81, American badminton player and FBI agent.
Lucia Cunanan, 80, Filipino restaurateur credited with inventing sisig, murdered.
Joe Feeney, 76, American tenor (The Lawrence Welk Show), emphysema.
Edward Norton Lorenz, 90, American professor of meteorology, cancer.
Fadel Shana'a, 24, Palestinian Reuters cameraman, flechette shell.
Joseph Solman, 99, American painter with Works Progress Administration.

17
Edna Andrade, 91, American abstract artist.
Aimé Césaire, 94, French Martiniquan poet and politician.
Richard Chopping, 90, British illustrator (James Bond).
Gwyneth Dunwoody, 77, British Labour MP for Crewe and Nantwich, following open heart surgery.
Danny Federici, 58, American keyboardist for Bruce Springsteen & The E Street Band, melanoma.
Nicolette Goulet, 52, American actress (The Guiding Light), daughter of Robert Goulet, breast cancer.
Zoya Krakhmalnikova, 79, Russian Christian dissident and writer.
Lloyd Lamble, 94, Australian actor.
Viktor Nosov, 67, Ukrainian football player and coach.
George Pollard, 89, American portrait painter (Harry Truman, Muhammad Ali), pneumonia.
*Rosario Sánchez Mora, 88, Spanish female anti-Franco veteran of the Spanish Civil War.
Mikhail Tanich, 84, Russian poet, kidney problems.
Su-Lin Young, 96, American explorer.

18
Refat Appazov, 87, Soviet-Crimean Tatar rocket scientist.
Peter Howard, 80, American music director and arranger, complications of Parkinson's Disease.
Michael de Larrabeiti, 73, British author (The Borrible Trilogy).
Kay Linaker, 94, American actress and screenwriter (The Blob).
Joy Page, 83, American actress (Casablanca), complications from a stroke and pneumonia.
Rosalie Ritz, 84, American courtroom artist (O.J. Simpson Trial, Sirhan Sirhan trial), lung cancer.
William W. Warner, 88, American biologist and writer, complications of Alzheimer's disease.
Charles S. Minter Jr., 93, Vice Admiral Of United States Navy and Superintendent of the United States Naval Academy in Annapolis, Maryland ( 1964 - 1965 ) .

19
Mohammad Abbas Baig, 90, Pakistani officer.
Hanan Al-Agha, 59-60, Palestinian-Jordanian writer, poet and plastic artist.
Bob Bledsaw, 65, American founder of Judges Guild, cancer.
Alessandro Cevese, 57, Italian ambassador to South Africa, Lesotho, Mauritius and Madagascar, car accident.
Lawrence Hertzog, 56, American television writer and producer (Nowhere Man), cancer.
Alfonso López Trujillo, 72, Colombian Catholic archbishop, president of Pontifical Council for the Family, diabetes.
John Marzano, 45, American baseball player (Boston Red Sox), co-host of Leading Off on mlb.com, injuries from a fall.
Germaine Tillion, 100, French anthropologist, member of French Resistance.
Constant Vanden Stock, 93, Belgian president of RSC Anderlecht football club.

20
Richard Alexander, 73, British politician, Conservative MP for Newark (1979–1997), cancer.
Bebe Barron, 82, American composer, pioneer of electronic music.
Frank Michael Beyer, 80, German composer.
Gazanfer Bilge, 85, Turkish freestyle wrestler, 1948 Olympic champion.
Farid Chopel, 55, French actor and singer, cancer. 
Orish Grinstead, 27, American vocalist and original member of R&B girl group 702.
Monica Lovinescu, 84, Romanian writer.
Derek McKay, 58, Scottish footballer (Deveronvale, Dundee, Aberdeen, Barrow), heart attack.
VL Mike, 30, American rapper, shot.
Nissan Nativ, 86, Israeli director, actor and acting teacher.
Tariq Niazi, 68, Pakistani field hockey player, member of 1968 Olympic gold medal team, cardiac arrest. 
Geoff Polites, 60, Australian CEO of Jaguar Land Rover.
William R. Snodgrass, 85, American government official, Comptroller of Tennessee (1955–1999).
Harry Ulinski, 83, American football player (Washington Redskins), sepsis.
Geoff Ward, 81, English cricketer (Kent and Essex).

21
Michel Allex, 60, French chocolatier and politician.
Monna Bell, 70, Chilean singer, stroke.
Fayr Jag, 8, Irish-bred, British-trained Thoroughbred racehorse, euthanised.
Darell Garretson, 76, American professional basketball referee.
Sharp Cat, 13-14, American Thoroughbred racehorse,  euthanized.
Aaron Shearer, 88, American classical guitarist.
Carmen Silva, 92, Brazilian actress, multiple organ failure. 
Al Wilson, 68, American soul singer ("Show and Tell"), kidney failure.

22
Jack Ansell, 86, English footballer.
Cameron Argetsinger, 87, American auto racing pioneer.
Bob Childers, 61, American singer-songwriter, emphysema.
Ed Chynoweth, 66, Canadian president of the Western Hockey League (1972–1995) and CHL (1975–1995), cancer.
Paul Davis, 60, American singer ("I Go Crazy", "'65 Love Affair", "Cool Night"), heart attack.
Safdar Kiyani, 60, Pakistani teacher and pro-vice-chancellor of the University of Balochistan, shot.
Dora Ratjen, 89, German high jumper, disguised as female to compete for Nazi Germany at 1936 Summer Olympics.
Francisco Martins Rodrigues, 81, Portuguese anti-Fascist resistant, Marxist-Leninist Committee founder, cancer. 
Daniel Lee Siebert, 54, American serial killer, pancreatic cancer.

23
Abdellatief Abouheif, 78, Egyptian marathon swimmer.
Jean-Daniel Cadinot, 64, French film director and producer, heart attack.
Don Gillis, 85, Canadian-born American sportscaster.
Martha Kostuch, 58, Canadian environmentalist, multiple system atrophy.
Cook Lougheed, 86, American entrepreneur and philanthropist.
Loreto Paras-Sulit, 99, Filipino writer.
Rustam Sani, 64, Malaysian politician, sociologist, political scientist and blogger.
Harold Stephenson, 87, British first-class wicketkeeper (Somerset).
William H. Stewart, 86, American surgeon general (1965–1969), complications from renal failure.

24
Lucy Appleby, 88, British traditional cheesemaker.
Tristram Cary, 82, British film and television composer (Doctor Who, The Ladykillers, Quatermass and the Pit).
James Day, 89, American television host, respiratory failure.
Harry Geris, 60, Canadian Olympic wrestler.
Jimmy Giuffre, 86, American jazz clarinetist, pneumonia.
Carlos Robalo, 76, Portuguese politician, Secretary of State (1980–1981).
Trilochan Singh, 85, Indian field hockey player, member of the gold medal-winning 1948 Summer Olympics team.

25
Enrico Donati, 99, Italian-born American surrealist painter and sculptor.
Sonny Grandelius, 79, American football player and coach.
R. Laird Harris, 97, American Presbyterian minister and Old Testament scholar.
Humphrey Lyttelton, 86, British jazz trumpeter and chairman of I'm Sorry I Haven't a Clue, following surgery for aortic aneurysm.
John H. McConnell, 84, American owner of Worthington Industries and the Columbus Blue Jackets.

26
Anzar Shah Kashmiri, 80, Indian Islamic scholar, heart and kidney problems.
Henry Brant, 94, Canadian-born American Pulitzer Prize-winning composer.
Moisey Feigin, 103, Russian artist, Guinness World Record–holder for the oldest professional working artist.
Wallace Gichere, 53, Kenyan photojournalist.
Yossi Harel, 90, Israeli captain of Exodus, cardiac arrest.
Carmen Scarpitta, 74, Italian actress,

27
Abraham Adesanya, 85, Nigerian politician, lawyer, and activist.
Ram Babu Gupta, 72, Indian cricket umpire.
Art Johnson, 88, American baseball player.
Ron O'Brien, 56, American disc jockey, pneumonia.
Mike Patrick, 55, American former NFL punter (New England Patriots).
Hal Stein, 79, American jazz musician.
Marios Tokas, 54, Greek Cypriot composer, cancer.
Sallie Wilson, 76, American ballerina, cancer.
Frances Yeend, 95, American soprano opera singer.

28
Alfredo José Anzola, 33, Venezuelan businessman, plane crash.
Diana Barnato Walker, 90, British aviator, first British woman to break the sound barrier.
John Barron, 74, Irish hurler.
Ivan Caesar, 41, American football player (Boston College, Minnesota Vikings, Portland Forest Dragons), gunshot.
Max Cherry, 81, Australian Olympics and Commonwealth Games athletics coach, heart attack.
Tarka Cordell, 40, British musician, suicide.
John Patrick Crecine, 69, American president of Georgia Tech (1987–1994).
Hans Eder, 81, Austrian Olympic skier.
Jack Hanrahan, 75, American Emmy Award–winning television script writer.
Sir Derek Higgs, 64, British chairman of Alliance & Leicester, heart attack.
Ed Marion, 81, American official in the National Football League from 1960 to 1987.
Will Robinson, 96, American coach, first African American Division I college basketball (ISU) coach, Detroit Pistons scout.

29
Jadesola Akande, 67, Nigerian lawyer, author and academic.
John Berkey, 75, American science fiction artist.
Bo Yang, 88, Taiwanese writer.
Ernesto Bonino, 86, Italian singer. 
Gordon Bradley, 74, British footballer and coach (North American Soccer League), Alzheimer's disease.
Lewis Croft, 88, American actor (Munchkin in The Wizard of Oz).
Chuck Daigh, 84, American racing driver, heart and respiratory disease.
Hassan Dehqani-Tafti, 87, Iranian Anglican Bishop, first ethnic Iranian Christian bishop since the 7th century.
Julie Ege, 64, Norwegian actress (On Her Majesty's Secret Service), breast cancer.
Tatsuo Hasegawa, 92, Japanese automotive engineer, development chief of the first Toyota Corolla.
Albert Hofmann, 102, Swiss researcher, chemist and discoverer of LSD, heart attack.
Sir Anthony Kershaw, 92, British Conservative MP (1955–1987).
Francis Mahoney, 80, American basketball player (Boston Celtics).
Terlingua, 32, American thoroughbred horse, infirmities of old age.
Charles Tilly, 78, American sociologist, historian and political scientist.
Micky Waller, 66, British drummer (Jeff Beck Group, Cyril Davies), liver failure.

30
Jean Ancel, 67-68, Romanian-born Israeli author and historian.
John Cargher, 89, Australian radio broadcaster, hosted Singers of Renown since 1966.
Juancho Evertsz, 85, Dutch Antillean politician, Prime Minister of the Netherlands Antilles (1973–1977).
Ling Ling, 22, Chinese panda, lived in Ueno Zoo, Tokyo, oldest giant panda in Japan, heart failure.
M. G. Pandithan, 68, Malaysian politician, leukemia.
Clarence Ross, 84, American bodybuilder.
Allan Sparrow, 63, Canadian politician, activist and Toronto city councillor (1974–1980), colorectal cancer.
Brian Plummer, 53–54, Canadian rock musician.

References

2008-04
 04